Chucun may refer to:

 Chucun, Mengcheng County (楚村镇), town in Anhui, China
 Chucun, Weihai (初村镇), town in Huancui District, Weihai, Shandong, China